The Wightlink Tigers was an amateur English ice hockey team from the Isle of Wight. The team was founded in July 2007 as the Vectis Tigers, and played at Ryde Arena, Isle of Wight. From the 2009–10 season onwards the team played as the Wightlink Tigers, after sponsors Wightlink. In its last competitive season (2015-16) the Tigers played in Division 2 of the National Ice Hockey League (NIHL) Southern Conference (SC). Many of the team's roster moved to the newly formed Wightlink Buccaneers, which debuted in the 2016–17 season in NIHL SC Division 2.

Season-by-season record
Note: GP = Games played, W = Wins, L = Losses, T = Ties, Pts = Points, GF = Goals for, GA = Goals against

References

External links

2007 establishments in England
Defunct ice hockey teams in the United Kingdom
Ice hockey clubs established in 2007
Sport on the Isle of Wight